Mister Twister is the name of three supervillains appearing in comic books published by DC Comics.

Publication history
The Bromwell Stikk version of Mister Twister first appeared in The Brave and the Bold #54 (July 1964), and was created by Bob Haney and Bruno Premiani. The character was the villain in the first story that brought together Robin, Kid Flash, and Aqualad — a group that would later become the Teen Titans.

The demon version of Mister Twister first appeared in Titans Hunt #2 and was created by Dan Abnett and Stephen Segovia.

Fictional character biography

Dan Judd
Dan Judd is a writer who decides to research his latest crime novel by becoming a criminal. Becoming Mister Twister, he forms a gang. When Superman stumbles upon his crime sprees, Mister Twister gets away by having Superman rescue some bystanders from danger. When Dan's gang discover that they are being used for his own novel, they double-cross him and rob him. Upon deducing Mister Twister's identity, Superman rescues Dan and rounds up his gang. Dan ends up in prison where he decides to write a novel on prison life. This is the character's only appearance.

Bromwell Stikk

The second Mister Twister is Bromwell Stikk. He was born in the small town of Hatton Corners. His ancestry can be traced back to Colonial times where his ancestor Jacob Stikk leased the town to the Colonists for the price of a feather from a passenger pigeon. Each year, the town elders gave the pigeon feather to the Stikk family as payment. Now in the present day, Bromwell Stikk leaves the town to live in exile on Goat Island. While there, he discovers a Native American cave and an old Shaman's medicine staff. When Bromwell dips the staff in a special brew, he discovers that he can control the forces of nature. With his new powers, Bromwell becomes Mister Twister and returns to Hatton Corners to take revenge on the people that spurned him. He demands payment of the feather of a passenger pigeon that was never given to his later ancestors. Due to the passenger pigeon going extinct in 1913, the mayor is unable to pay. Mister Twister punishes the town by summoning a tornado that whisks away the town's teenage populace. Upon enslaving the teenagers, Mister Twister brings them to Goat Island where he has them erect a twister-shaped stone tower in his honor. Robin, Kid Flash, and Aqualad arrive in Hatton Corners and learn of the incident, and head off to Goat Island. Kid Flash manages to erect the tower for the children, as Aqualad summons a large whale to move the island. When Mister Twister discovers the island is not in its usual location, he causes havoc in Hatton Corners. He manages to subdue Aqualad and Kid Flash before Robin uses his Batrope to disarm Mister Twister of his staff. Mister Twister is taken into custody and the children are reunited with their parents. Afterwards, Robin, Aqualad, and Kid Flash form the Teen Titans.

It is later revealed that the Teen Titans' battle with Mister Twister had caught the attention of the malevolent entity known as the Antithesis, who uses Mister Twister as an instrument of revenge. He summons Mister Twister and transforms him into the Gargoyle. In this new form, Gargoyle fights the Teen Titans. As the Gargoyle, Bromwell manages to sow the seeds of doubt in all the Teen Titans except for Robin. Robin surrenders, allowing him to be transported to Limbo so that he can fight Gargoyle. Upon smashing Gargoyle's ring, Robin manages to trap Gargoyle in Limbo.

While the Teen Titans are on a mission overseas, Mal Duncan accidentally releases Gargoyle from Limbo. Mal proves himself a hero by sending Gargoyle back to Limbo.

Gargoyle later hypnotizes the Titans to make them enjoy life as if they were never Teen Titans.

Many years later during the Infinite Crisis, Mister Twister (who has apparently returned to human form) is among the mystics in Stonehenge using magic to bind the Spectre to Crispus Allen.

One Year Later, Bromwell Stikk is shown amongst the homeless living in the soup kitchen during Christmas. He encounters Roy Harper who has volunteered at the soup kitchen. Though Bromwell was bitter at first, he makes peace with Roy and is grateful that someone remembered who he was.

Demon
In "DC Rebirth", Mister Twister is re-established as a demon.

Powers and abilities
The first Mister Twister has no powers.

The second Mister Twister used a stick that enabled him to control the weather (mostly tornadoes) and can ride on the crown of the tornado. He can summon fire that rains down from the sky and fire blasts of lightning from his staff. The staff can also generate an invisible force field that protects Mister Twister from physical harm. The power of the staff eventually depletes itself unless Mister Twister bathes in a hot potion inside the medicine cave. As the Gargoyle, he has super-strength, endurance, and stamina as well as negativity and hypnotic powers.

The third Mister Twister possesses telepathy and mind-control. He also wields a staff that enables him to have finer control over his victims as long as they are in close range of his staff.

Other versions

"Mirror World"
In an alternate universe encountered by the Flash and Captain Cold, the lack of any speedsters has changed Mister Twister's first encounter with the Titans. He kills Speedy and Aqualad and puts Wonder Girl in a coma. For that, the Amazons behead Mister Twister whose head is left on a spike outside of the Justice League's headquarters.

Titans Tomorrow
In the Titans Tomorrow storyline, it was mentioned that the Titans East halted a hurricane that Mister Twister created.

In other media
The Bromwell Stikk incarnation of Mister Twister appears in the Young Justice episode "Welcome to Happy Harbor", voiced by John de Lancie. This version is an assistant to T.O. Morrow and member of the Light who uses armor with weather-controlling capabilities.

References

External links
 Mister Twister (Dan Judd) at the DC Comics Wiki
 
 Mister Twister (Bromwell Stikk) at the DC Comics Wiki
 
 Mister Twister (demon) at the DC Comics Wiki
 

Characters created by Bob Haney
Characters created by Dan Abnett
Comics characters introduced in 1946
Comics characters introduced in 1964
Comics characters introduced in 2016
DC Comics supervillains
Fictional characters with weather abilities